The First United Methodist Church, formerly First Methodist Episcopal Church, South, is a historic Methodist church at 200 N. 12th Avenue in Humboldt, Tennessee.

The church was organized in 1860, the second church to be established in Humboldt. Its current building was completed in 1899, replacing a frame building that had been built on the same site in 1867. It was added to the National Register of Historic Places in 2008.

References

External links
 official website

Methodist churches in Tennessee
Churches on the National Register of Historic Places in Tennessee
Gothic Revival church buildings in Tennessee
Churches completed in 1899
19th-century Episcopal church buildings
Buildings and structures in Gibson County, Tennessee
National Register of Historic Places in Gibson County, Tennessee
1860 establishments in Tennessee